Tariq Javed Banuri (Urdu: طارق جاوید بنوری) is a Pakistani academic, development economist, environmentalist, climate scientist, educationalist, human rights advocate, and author who holds a PhD in economics from Harvard University and who is the fourth and current Chairperson of the Higher Education Commission (HEC), a statutorily established regulatory agency whose mandate is to improve 
and promote higher education and research & development (R&D) within Pakistan. Tariq Banuri has broad experience on the interface between policy, research, and practical actions on the realization of the goal of sustainable development. He has worked in government, academia, civil society, and the international system, specializing in economic development. 

He started his career as a member of the erstwhile Civil Service of Pakistan (CSP), and served in a number of positions, including as a Research Fellow at the World Institute for Development Economics Research (WIDER), Professor of Economics at The University of Utah (2012-18), Director at the United Nations Division for Sustainable Development (UNDSD) — being the first person of colour ever to hold this position — founder and first Executive Director of the Sustainable Development Policy Institute (SDPI), Director at the Asia Centre of the Stockholm Environment Institute (SEI), and Executive Director of the Global Change Impact Studies Centre (GCISC), a statutory corporation established under the GCISC Act, 2013.

He has served on national as well as international forums for policy and research, including as Coordinating Lead Author on the Nobel Prize-winning Intergovernmental Panel on Climate Change (IPCC), member of the United Nations Secretary General’s Advisory Group on Energy and Climate Change (AGECC), member of the United Nations Committee on Development Policy (CDP), member of the Pakistan Environmental Protection Council, member of the Central Board of Governors of the State Bank of Pakistan, and Member Secretary of the Presidential Steering Committee on Higher Education.

An expert on sustainable development policy and institutional design, he has been instrumental in the design of a number of institutions and networks on sustainable development, including the Sustainable Development Policy Institute (SDPI), the Sarhad Rural Support Programme (SRSP), the Asia Centre of the Stockholm Environment Institute (SEI), the United Nations Office of Sustainable Development (UNOSD), the Ring alliance, the Sustainable Mekong Research Network (SUMERNET), the Human Development Foundation of North America (HDFNA), the U.S.-Pakistan Center for Advanced Studies in Water (USPCAS-W), and the Great Transition Initiative (GTI).

In 1992, he founded the Sustainable Development Policy Institute (SDPI), Pakistan's first ever independent think tank, and currently Pakistan's top-ranked think tank according to the University of Pennsylvania’s Think Tanks and Civil Societies Program (TTCSP) 2020 Global Go To Think Tank Index report.

In 2003, he was awarded the Sitara-e-Imtiaz by the then Government of Pakistan for his services to research and education.

In 2007, he was recognized for his contribution to the award of the Nobel Peace Prize to the Intergovernmental Panel on Climate Change (IPCC), which was awarded jointly to the Intergovernmental Panel on Climate Change (IPCC) and Albert Arnold (Al) Gore, Jr. "for their efforts to build up and disseminate greater knowledge about man-made climate change, and to lay the foundations for the measures that are needed to counteract such change."

In 2008, he was called by the then Secretary-General of the United Nations, Ban Ki-moon, to head the United Nations Division for Sustainable Development (UNDSD) — the largest division of the United Nations — becoming the first person of colour ever to hold this position, which he held until 2011. During his tenure as Director of the UNDSD, he helped lay the groundwork for what would soon thereafter become the Sustainable Development Goals (SDGs).

In 2018, he was appointed as the fourth Chairperson of the Higher Education Commission (HEC), the apex governing body of higher education in Pakistan. His appointment was made by the then elected prime minister on the recommendation of a non-partisan, high-powered search committee convened by the venerable Syed Babar Ali (founder of the Lahore University of Management Sciences and one of the founding fathers of the HEC).  In March 2021, he was removed from office unceremoniously on the basis of an amendment to the HEC Ordinance, 2002 through a presidential ordinance that reduced the chairman’s tenure from four years to two years, but was restored in January 2022 by the Islamabad High Court after a petition was filed by Mosharraf Ali Zaidi and others.

Positions Held 

 Chairman, Higher Education Commission (HEC), Pakistan
 Professor of Economics, The University of Utah
 Associate Director, US-Pakistan Center for Advanced Studies in Water (USPCAS-W)
 Director, United Nations Division for Sustainable Development (UNDSD)
 Senior Research Director, Tellus Institute
 Founding member of the Great Transition Initiative (GTI)
 Founding Executive Director of the Sustainable Development Policy Institute (SDPI)
 Founding Director, Asia Centre of the Stockholm Environment Institute (SEI)
 Executive Director, Global Change Impact Studies Centre (GCISC)
 Coordinating Lead Author, Intergovernmental Panel on Climate Change (IPCC)
 Research Fellow at the United Nations University World Institute for Development Economics Research (UNU-WIDER)
 Judge, Climate CoLab, Massachusetts Institute of Technology (MIT)
 Assistant Professor of Economics, University of Massachusetts Amherst
 Chair of the Board of Governors of the International Centre for Trade and Sustainable Development (ICTSD)
 Member Secretary of the Presidential Steering Committee on Higher Education, Pakistan
 Member of the United Nations Secretary General’s Advisory Group on Energy and Climate Change (AGECC) 
 Member of the United Nations Committee on Development Policy (CDP)
 Member of the Pakistan Environmental Protection Council (PEPC)
 Member of the Central Board of Governors of the State Bank of Pakistan (SBP)
 Assistant Commissioner (AC), Civil Service of Pakistan (CSP)
 President, Student Union, University of Peshawar

Books 

Economic Liberalization: No Panacea
Financial Openness and National Autonomy
Just Development: Beyond Adjustment with a Human Face
Who will Save the Forests? Knowledge, Power, and Environmental Destruction
Civic Entrepreneurship: A Civil Society Perspective on Sustainable Development
Great Transition: The Promise and Lure of the Times Ahead
The Dispensation of Justice in Pakistan

Official Publications 
2011                Climate Change, Durban, and Rio+20, Paper presented at UNDP Conference on Climate Change, Algiers, 11-13 October 2011

2011                Contributor, World Economic and Social Survey 2011 (Technological Change and Sustainable Development)

2011                Contributor (and Main Author of Section on Sustainable Development), UN System-wide Study on the Implications of the Fukushima Disaster

2011                Main Author and Editor, Secretary General’s Report to 2nd Preparatory Committee Meeting of the UN Conference on Sustainable      Development

2010                Contributor and Convenor, Technical Note on Global Green New Deal for Climate, Energy, and Development

2010                Main Author and Editor, Secretary General’s Report to 1st Preparatory Committee Meeting of the UN Conference on Sustainable Development      

(http://www.uncsd2012.org/content/documents/N1070657.pdf).

2009                Main Author and Editor, Secretary General’s Report on Climate Change and its Possible Security Implications (http://daccess-dds-        

ny.un.org/doc/UNDOC/GEN/N09/509/46/PDF/N0950946.pdf?OpenElement)

2009                Contributor, World Economic and Social Survey 2009 (Climate Change and Sustainable Development)

2009                Co-author, DESA Policy Brief, Global Green New Deal for Sustainable Development, New York: United Nations

2003                T. Banuri and Mosharraf Zaidi, ICTs and the MDGs in Pakistan, Kuala Lumpur: UNDP-APDIP

2002                T. Banuri and Ali Qadir, One Way Street: Pakistan’s Trade Policy After Doha, Islamabad: Government of Pakistan, Ministry of Commerce, 2002

1994                Contributor and Editor, Pakistan National Report to the CSD, Islamabad: Environment and Urban Affairs Division

1993                Contributor and Editor, Pakistan National Report to the CSD, Islamabad: Environment and Urban Affairs Division

1993                Editor, The NCS: Plan of Action, 1993-98, Islamabad: Environment and Urban Affairs Division

1993                Contributor to chapters on Basic Framework, and Education, Eight Five Year Plan, 1993-98, Islamabad: Planning Commission

1993                Islamabad: Environment and Urban Affairs Division; Contributor to Report of SAARC Poverty Commission, Kathmandu: SAARC Secretariat;

1992                Editor and Lead Author, Pakistan National Report to UNCED, Islamabad: Government of Pakistan, Environment and Urban Affairs Division

1989                With Tariq Hussain, Conceptual Design of Sarhad Rural Support Corporation, Peshawar: Government of NWFP

1989                Conceptual Design for the SAARC Centre for Human Resource Development, Islamabad, Government of Pakistan, Planning Commission

References

Living people
Harvard Graduate School of Arts and Sciences alumni
Pakistani academic administrators
University of Peshawar alumni
Williams College alumni
Year of birth missing (living people)

6. https://www.thenews.com.pk/amp/813837-civil-society-demands-restoring-dr-tariq-banuri-as-hec-head

7. https://faculty.utah.edu/u0845940-Tariq_Banuri/hm/index.hml